The Guildford Crows are an Australian rules football club based in Guildford, England.

History
The Guildford Crows were formed in 2009. During their first season the Crows competed in two friendly matches only, against The Portsmouth Pirates and the Chichester University team.

The Crows currently train in Stoke Park, Guildford most Saturday mornings and Tuesday evenings during the Summer.

2011 season

In 2011 the Crows entered the AFL Britain Southern Division where they compete with The Bournemouth Demons, The Sussex Swans (Brighton), The Chippenham Redbacks, The Portsmouth Pirates and The Southampton Titans.

After losing their first five games, the Crows finally recorded their first victory beating the Southampton Titans 84-51 on 18 June. They followed this with a winning streak that included victories over the Sussex Swans and the Portsmouth Pirates.

The final game of the regular season came when the Crows played their first ever home fixture on 23 July 2011 at Effingham and Leatherhead Rugby Club.

The Crows finished the 2011 season fifth in the league, only losing out to Portsmouth for fourth place on goal difference.

2012 season

For the 2012 season The Guildford Crows secured their first ever sponsorship deal with Banner Managed Communication.

See also

References

External links
 Official Website
 Adelaide Crows FC
 Banner Managed Communications

Australian rules football clubs in England
2009 establishments in England
Australian rules football clubs established in 2009
Sport in Guildford